The Eagle Has Landed – Part III is a double live album by the English heavy metal band Saxon, released in 2006.

Track listing

Personnel
Biff Byford - vocals                     
Doug Scarratt - guitar
Paul Quinn - guitar
Nibbs Carter - bass guitar
Nigel Glockler - drums (2005 recordings)
Jörg Michael - drums (2004 recordings)

References

Saxon (band) live albums
2006 live albums
SPV/Steamhammer live albums